The Basilicata regional election of 1985 took place on 12 May 1985.

Events
Christian Democracy was by far the largest party, largely ahead of the Italian Communist Party, which came distantly second. After the election Christian Democrat Gaetano Michetti was elected President of the Region.

Results

Source: Ministry of the Interior

Elections in Basilicata
1985 elections in Italy